Gerd Miran or Gerdmiran, also rendered as Gird Miran, may refer to:
 Gerd Miran-e Olya
 Gerd Miran-e Sofla